The almud is a unit of measurement of volume used in France, Spain and in parts of the Americas that were colonized by each country. The word comes from the Arabic al-múdd." The exact value of the almud was different from region to region, and also varied according to the nature of the measured good. In Portugal the name almude was used and their values were  much larger than the Spanish ones. It is still used in rural Mexico, Panama, Chile and other countries. An almud is a box with internal marks, indicating different measurements.

It was also used to name a given surface of land, said surface corresponding to how much could be seeded with the quantity of grain contained in an almud.

 Iberian Spain: 4.625 liters
 Canary Islands, at Las Palmas: 5.50 liters

 Argentina
Córdoba: 18.08 liters
Corrientes: 21.49 liters
Mendoza: 9.31 liters
 Belize: 5.683 liters
 Chile: 8.08 liters
 Mexico: 7.568 liters
 Philippines: 1.76 liters
 Puerto Rico: 20 liters
 United States, New Mexico: 412.71 cubic inches, approximately 6.76 liters.

As unit of mass 
In some South American countries an almud was a unit of mass.
Bolivia
Tarata, Cochabamba: 7.36 kg.
Arampampa, Potosí: 4.14 kg.
Buena Vista, Santa Cruz: 14.72 kg.
Ecuador: 12.88 kg.
Venezuela: varied between 9 and 50 kg.

See also
 Spanish customary units

References

Units of volume